Gedas Butrimavičius (born 26 January 1980) is a Lithuanian football defender, who represents Znicz Pruszków.

Career
Butrimavičius started his career with Polonija Vilnius.

International career
He has two caps in the Lithuania national football team and has scored once.

External links
 

1980 births
Living people
Lithuanian footballers
Lithuania international footballers
Lithuanian expatriate footballers
A Lyga players
Atlantis FC players
Expatriate footballers in Finland
Expatriate footballers in Poland
Association football defenders